The following is a list of the rosters for the Finland women's national ice hockey team in various international competitions.

Winter Olympics 
The Finnish national team has participated in every Olympic women's ice hockey tournament since the tournament was added to the Winter Olympics program in 1998.

2022 Winter Olympics

The roster was announced on 20 January 2022.

Head coach: Pasi Mustonen

2018 Winter Olympics

2014 Winter Olympics
Roster for the women's ice hockey tournament at the 2014 Winter Olympics in Sochi.

2010 Winter Olympics
Roster for the women's ice hockey tournament at the 2010 Winter Olympics in Vancouver.

2006 Winter Olympics
Roster for the women's ice hockey tournament at the 2006 Winter Olympics in Turin.

2002 Winter Olympics
Roster for the women's ice hockey tournament at the 2002 Winter Olympics in Provo and West Valley City, Utah.

Pirjo Ahonen, Sari Fisk, Kirsi Hänninen, Satu Hoikkala, Emma Laaksonen-Terho, Terhi Mertanen, Riikka Nieminen-Välilä, Marja-Helena Pälvilä, Oona Parviainen, Tuula Puputti, Karoliina Rantamäki, Tiia Reima, Katja Riipi, Päivi Salo, Henna Savikuja, Hanne Sikiö, Saija Sirviö-Tarkki, Petra Vaarakallio, Marjo Voutilainen

1998 Winter Olympics
Roster for the women's ice hockey tournament at the 1998 Winter Olympics in Nagano.

Emma Laaksonen-Terho, Riikka Nieminen-Välilä, Johanna Ikonen, Karoliina Rantamäki, Katja Riipi, Katja Lehto, Kirsi Hänninen, Liisa-Maria Sneck, Maria Selin, Marianne Ihalainen, Marika Lehtimäki, Marja-Helena Pälvilä, Päivi Salo, Petra Vaarakallio, Sanna Lankosaari, Sari Fisk, Sari Krooks, Satu Huotari, Tiia Reima, Tuula Puputti

World Championship

2022 IIHF Women's World Championship 
Roster for the 2022 IIHF Women's World Championship in Herning and Frederikshavn, Denmark, as published by the Finnish Ice Hockey Association on 3 August 2022.

Head coach: Juuso ToivolaAssistant coaches: Saara Niemi, Mikko Palsola, Vesa Virta

2021 IIHF Women's World Championship 
Roster for the 2021 IIHF Women's World Championship in Calgary, as published by the Finnish Ice Hockey Association on 3 August 2021.

Head coach: Pasi MustonenAssistant coaches: Kari Eloranta, Juuso Toivola, Vesa Virta

2020 IIHF Women's World Championship
The Finnish roster published for the 2020 IIHF Women's World Championship in Halifax and Truro, Nova Scotia. The tournament was ultimately cancelled due to the COVID-19 pandemic, with no games played.

Head Coach: Pasi Mustonen

2019 IIHF Women's World Championship
The Finnish roster for the 2019 IIHF Women's World Championship in Espoo.

Head Coach: Pasi Mustonen

References

Finland women's national ice hockey team rosters
Women's national ice hockey teams
Finland women's national ice hockey team
Finnish ice hockey people
ice hockey
National ice hockey team rosters